Habib Sissoko (born 2 January 1959) is a Malian judoka. He competed in the men's extra-lightweight event at the 1980 Summer Olympics.

References

External links
 

1959 births
Living people
Malian male judoka
Olympic judoka of Mali
Judoka at the 1980 Summer Olympics
Place of birth missing (living people)
21st-century Malian people